William Marsden (August 1796 – 16 January 1867) was an English surgeon whose main achievements are the founding of two presently well-known hospitals, the Royal Free Hospital (in 1828) and the Royal Marsden Hospital (in 1851).

Marsden was born in Sheffield, Yorkshire, the youngest of eight children. When he left school he was apprenticed to a wholesale druggist in Sheffield. In 1816, he moved to London where he took up an apprenticeship to a surgeon-apothecary before setting up on his own. At the end of 1824 he enrolled as a student of surgery at St Bartholomew's Hospital under the famous surgeon and lecturer John Abernethy (1764–1831). In April 1827 Marsden passed his MRCS examination to qualify as a full surgeon. He became an MD in 1838. 

After discovering the difficulties the poor had in obtaining medical treatment, Marsden sought to establish a free hospital in London for which "poverty and sickness are the only passports". In 1828 he set up a small dispensary at 16 Greville Street, Hatton Garden, Holborn, which was named the London General Institution for the Gratuitous Cure of Malignant Diseases. This was later constituted as the Royal Free Hospital, and moved to the Gray's Inn Road in the 1840s. 

A few years later, Marsden turned his attention to cancer sufferers and, in 1851, set up another small establishment in Cannon Row, Westminster. This grew into the Brompton Cancer Hospital (now the Royal Marsden Hospital, Fulham Road site).

Marsden married Ann Bishop, known as Betsy-Ann, in 1820. They had four children, three sons and a daughter, but only one of them, Alexander Edwin Marsden, a surgeon (1832–1902), survived into adulthood. Betsy-Ann died of cancer in 1846 and Marsden married his second wife, Elizabeth Abbott.

William Marsden died at a hotel in Richmond, Surrey, in 1867. He is buried in West Norwood Cemetery, South London.

References

Further reading 
 McIntyre N. William Marsden's Yorkshire family, 1749-1922. J Med Biogr 2004;12:154-60. .
 Ford JM. William Marsden (1796–1867); Alexander Marsden (1832–1902). J Med Biogr 2002;10:62. .
 Sandwith, Frieda. Surgeon Compassionate; The Story of Dr. William Marsden M.D., M.R.C.S.  Peter Davies, London, 1960. (The author is the great-granddaughter of Dr. Marsden).

External links
 Marsden family papers at the Royal Free Hospital Archive Centre

English surgeons
1796 births
1867 deaths
Burials at West Norwood Cemetery
Alumni of the Medical College of St Bartholomew's Hospital
Royal Marsden Hospital
Royal Free Hospital